David Hempstead (October 2, 1909 - January 9, 1983) was an American film producer known for None but the Lonely Heart (1944), The Sky's the Limit (1943), directed by Edward H. Griffith, and Joan of Paris (1942), directed by Robert Stevenson. He co-wrote the script of Hell and High Water (1954) alongside Jesse Lasky.

He produced with RKO and worked alongside Milton Holmes. He also produced Village Tale (1935), directed by John Cromwell and written by Allan Scott.

Filmography

Producer
 The King and Four Queens (1956)
 Portrait of Jennie (1948)
 None But the Lonely Heart (1944)
 Tender Comrade (1943)
 The Sky's the Limit (1943)
 Mr. Lucky (1943)
 Flight for Freedom (1943)
 Joan of Paris (1942)
 Kitty Foyle (1940)
 It Could Happen to You (1939)
 Just Around the Corner (1938)
 Straight Place and Show (1938)
 Hold That Co-ed (1938)
 Little Miss Broadway (1938)
 Happy Landing (1938)
 Ali Baba Goes to Town (1937)
 Village Tale (1935)
 Murder on a Honeymoon (1935)

Writer
 Hell and High Water (1954)
 Finishing School (1934)
 Little Women (1933)
 Manhattan Tower (1932)

Director
 Banjo on My Knee (1936)

References

Bibliography

External links
 

1909 births
1983 deaths
American film producers
Screenwriters from Utah
American male screenwriters
20th-century American male writers
20th-century American screenwriters